Robert Joseph Hogan (September 28, 1933 – May 27, 2021) was an American actor. Hogan was best known to audiences for his career in American television which began in 1961. While he has never been a member of the main cast of a critically successful television series, he portrayed numerous recurring characters on programs such as Alice; Another World; As the World Turns; Days of Our Lives; Deadline; General Hospital; Law & Order; Murder, She Wrote; One Life to Live; Operation Petticoat; Peyton Place and The Wire. His guest star appearances on other television series encompassed more than 90 shows over the last five decades. The character of US Army Air Forces colonel Robert Hogan on Hogan's Heroes (portrayed by Bob Crane) was named after him by friend and series creator Bernard Fein.

Early years 
Hogan was born in New York City on September 28, 1933. He studied engineering at the New York University, and served in the U.S. Army during the Korean War. His interest in acting led to his studying at the American Academy of Dramatic Arts.

Career

Early: 1961–1979
Hogan began his career appearing in theater, making his professional debut as Elliot in the original 1961 Off-Broadway production of Michael Shurtleff's Call Me by My Rightful Name with Robert Duvall and Joan Hackett. He relocated to Los Angeles shortly thereafter to pursue a career in television and film. He landed work almost immediately upon his arrival, appearing as a guest star in episodes of 77 Sunset Strip and Cheyenne in 1961. He maintained an active career as a guest star on television programs throughout the 1960s on such programs as Batman (episodes 7 and 8); Bonanza; Fair Exchange; Gomer Pyle, U.S.M.C.; Hawaiian Eye; I Dream of Jeannie; Hogan's Heroes; Twelve O'Clock High; and The Twilight Zone ("Spur of the Moment"), among others. He appeared in two 1963 films: FBI Code 98 and Greenwich Village Story. In 1968 he landed the role of Reverend Tom Winter on the soap opera Peyton Place, which he portrayed for two seasons.

In 1969, Hogan played Toby on an episode of Bonanza called "A Ride in the Sun".  He joined the cast of Days of Our Lives, portraying Will Austin for a short time and then in 1970 returned portraying the recurring role of Scott Banning, Sr. for two years. He continued to be active working as a guest actor for episodic television series throughout the 1970s for programs like The F.B.I., Gunsmoke, Hawaii Five-O, M*A*S*H, Mission: Impossible, Mork & Mindy, The Mary Tyler Moore Show, and The Rockford Files among many others. He portrayed the role of Sheriff Paul Tate on the relatively short lived series The Manhunter, Reed Carpenter on the Barnaby Jones episode titled "Requiem for a Son" (01/28/1973), the role of Ben Krisler in the mini-series Once an Eagle (1976), and appeared in the episode "No Way Out" from the 1977 anthology series Quinn Martin's Tales of the Unexpected (known in the United Kingdom as Twist in the Tale) and in the pilot episode of The Eddie Capra Mysteries in 1978. He also played the recurring characters of Burt Marshall on General Hospital (1973), Lieutenant Commander Haller on Operation Petticoat (1978–1979), and Greg Stemple on Alice (1977–1982). He also appeared in several television movies, including Heatwave! (1974) and Roll, Freddy, Roll! (1974), and on the big screen as Jake Lingle in The Lady in Red (1979).

Middle: 1980–1999
Hogan continued to maintain an active television career throughout the 1980s, appearing as a guest actor on such shows as Airwolf, Barnaby Jones, The Incredible Hulk, Knight Rider, Laverne & Shirley, Magnum, P.I., Quincy M.E., Hill Street Blues, St. Elsewhere, and T.J. Hooker to name just a few. He also portrayed the recurring roles of Dr. Wylie Graham on Murder, She Wrote (1984–1989) and Vince McKinnon on Another World (1987–1989, 1991). He also appeared in a number of television movies including Natalie Wood's final completed film The Memory of Eva Ryker (1980), and in the role of John F. Kennedy in the film Prince Jack (1985).

During the 1990s Hogan returned to working in the theatre. He made his Broadway debut in November 1989, as Capt. Matthew A. Markinson in the original production of Aaron Sorkin's A Few Good Men, remaining with the show for more than a year. He returned to Broadway in 1992 to portray the roles of the Ghost and the Player King in William Shakespeare's Hamlet. He also appeared in numerous Off-Broadway productions, including Neal Bell's On the Bum (1992), Mark R. Shapiro's The Shattering (1996), Frank Pugliese's Hope is the Thing with Feathers (1998), and John Logan's Never the Sinner (1998). For his performance in the latter play he won an Outer Critics Circle Award.

With his career more centered on the stage, Hogan's television career slowed somewhat during the 1990s. He portrayed the recurring roles of "L.J. McDermott" on As the World Turns (1991–1992) and Charles Briggs on One Life to Live (1995–1998, 2000). He appeared as a guest actor on the shows Remember WENN (1997), Cosby (1997), and Now and Again (1999), and in such feature films as Species II (1998) and Advice from a Caterpillar (1999).

Later: 2000–2019
Hogan continued to remain active in television, film, and theatre during the last decade. He notably portrayed the recurring roles of Phil Carbone on Deadline (2000), Louis Sobotka on The Wire (2003), and Judge Hugo Bright on Law & Order (2003–2006). He appeared in the films Maze (2000), Cupid & Cate (2000), Brooklyn Sonnet (2000), The Sleepy Time Gal (2001), Sweet Land (2005), Day Zero (2007), Universal Signs (2008), and Welcome to Academia (2009). He also appeared Off-Broadway in the plays Further Than the Furthest Thing (2002), Boy (2004), The Accomplices (2007), and Mourning Becomes Electra (2009).

Hogan's appearance in a 1965 episode of The F.B.I. titled "All the Streets Are Silent" was briefly featured during a scene in Quentin Tarantino's Once Upon a Time in Hollywood in 2019.

Personal life
Hogan was married to Mary Barbera from 1983, until his death. He was previously married to Sharon Harper, whom he married in 1957; they had three children together before they divorced in 1982.

Hogan was diagnosed with Alzheimer's disease in 2013. He died from complications of pneumonia at his home in Maine on May 27, 2021, aged 87.

Filmography

References

External links

1933 births
2021 deaths
20th-century American male actors
21st-century American male actors
American male film actors
American male soap opera actors
American male stage actors
American male television actors
Deaths from Alzheimer's disease
Deaths from pneumonia in Maine
Male actors from Maine
Male actors from New York City
Deaths from dementia in Maine